Thomas Clark was a professional footballer who played as a full-back.

Career statistics
Source:

References

English footballers
Association football fullbacks
Port Vale F.C. players
Sunderland A.F.C. players
Carlisle United F.C. players